Sara Vaughn (born May 16, 1986) is an American middle-distance runner. Sara placed 18th in the women's 1500 metres at the 2017 World Championships in Athletics. Vaughn placed 10th in 2012 IAAF World Indoor Championships – Women's 1500 metres at the 2012 IAAF World Indoor Championships.

Professional
On December 5, Sara Vaughn won 2021 California International Marathon in 2:26:53. This victory was her debut at the marathon distance and follows her 5th place 1500 m race at Diamond League Prefontaine Classic in August. Vaughn place 22nd at New York Road Runners United Airlines NYC Half-Marathon in 1:12:56. Vaughn place 21st at 2022 Boston Marathon in 2:36:27.
On October 9th, Sara Vaughn placed 7th at 2022 Chicago Marathon in a personal best time of 2:26:23.

NCAA
While competing for the Buffs, Sara received All-American honors. Sara set top 15 time in University of Colorado Boulder history at 2007 Cardinal Invitational 1500 meters in 4:19.70.

Prep and personal life
Sara Vaughn was born in small western Nebraska town of Gering, Nebraska, Sara attended Gering High School in Gering, NE prior to garnering degrees in Psychology and Spanish from University of Colorado. Vaughn was all-state in cross country all four years, the Nebraska Class B 1600m champions with a time of 4:58.15, and 2004 All-class 800, 1600 and 3200m champion.

The local newspaper Scottsbluff Star Herald named Sara Ensrud the 2004 Athlete of the Year. Sara also received Scottsbluff Star Herald Athlete of the Year in 2001 and 2003.

References

External links

1986 births
Living people
American female middle-distance runners
World Athletics Championships athletes for the United States
Sportspeople from Nebraska
Track and field athletes from Colorado
Track and field athletes from Nebraska
American female cross country runners
American female steeplechase runners
Colorado Buffaloes women's cross country runners
Colorado Buffaloes women's track and field athletes
American real estate businesspeople
University of Colorado Boulder alumni